The Lake Turkana barb (Enteromius turkanae) is a species of ray-finned fish in the  family Cyprinidae. It is endemic to Lake Turkana in Kenya. It is not considered a threatened species by the IUCN.

References

Enteromius
Freshwater fish of Kenya
Fish of Lake Turkana
Fish described in 1982
Taxonomy articles created by Polbot